James Patrick Sheridan (born July 12, 1951) is an American actor known for playing a wide range of roles in theater, film, and television. He's best known for Randall Flagg in The Stand (1994), Captain James Deakins on Law & Order: Criminal Intent (2001-2006), and Robert Queen on Arrow (2012-2019).

Career

Sheridan's acting career has encompassed theater, television, and feature film productions. Born in Pasadena, California, to a family of actors, he earned a Tony nomination in 1987 for his performance in the revival of Arthur Miller's All My Sons. After several TV movie appearances, Sheridan landed a starring role as lawyer Jack Shannon on Shannon's Deal, which ran for one season in 1990. His later television roles include Dr. John Sutton on Chicago Hope (from 1995 to 1996).

An avid football player in his youth, Sheridan studied acting at UC Santa Barbara as sports injuries prevented him from taking dance classes. After a brief stint at the Old Globe in San Diego, Sheridan left California to travel the world. With stops in Hawaii and the Mediterranean, Sheridan settled for a period in Edinburgh. His experience there prompted him to head home to the U.S. and return to acting. He landed in New York and kept busy working in a number of productions by recognized playwrights as diverse as Bernard Shaw and Neil Simon.

Sheridan started his film career in the late 1980s with small roles. His first on screen appearance was in the Whoopi Goldberg vehicle Jumpin Jack Flash. By the 1990s, he was playing family man roles in both film and television, such as in the 1991 motion picture All I Want for Christmas. He also has played villains. In 1994 he played the character of Randall Flagg in the miniseries adaptation of Stephen King's The Stand. Other roles include Marty Stouffer in Wild America and the psychotic neighbor in Video Voyeur: The Susan Wilson Story. After a long history of performing Shakespeare on the stage, Sheridan appeared in Campbell Scott's production of Hamlet in 2000 as well as the Hamlet-inspired modern noir film Let the Devil Wear Black (1999). He co-starred in the improvisational film The Simian Line in 2001. He has also given supporting performances in The Ice Storm, Cradle Will Rock, Life as a House, and numerous TV movies.

More recently, Sheridan played Capt. James Deakins in the television series Law & Order: Criminal Intent. Late in the 2004–2005 season, Sheridan began wearing an eyepatch as he began showing the symptoms of Bell's palsy. This was written into the show; however, Deakins was written out of the series at the end of the 2005–2006 season, at Sheridan's request. His character was replaced by Capt. Danny Ross, played by Eric Bogosian.

Sheridan played alongside Jane Seymour in the Hallmark Channel movie Dear Prudence as Detective Eddie Duncan. On November 6, 2008, Sheridan guest starred as an evening news anchor on the ABC dramedy Eli Stone.

From 2009 to 2010, Sheridan starred in NBC's Trauma as Dr. Joseph "Joe" Saviano. In 2010 Sheridan starred in the movie Handsome Harry, a drama. He played speechwriter Mark Salter in the political film Game Change.

In fall 2011, Sheridan played Vice President William Walden in the first season of Showtime's drama/thriller Homeland; the show was renewed for a second season consisting of 12 episodes, with Sheridan returning as a regular.

In the fall of 2012, Sheridan signed on to play a recurring role on CW's Arrow, playing Robert Queen, Oliver Queen's father. He appears in seasons one, three, five, and seven, mainly through flashbacks.

Sheridan played Jim Sullivan in the 2015 film Spotlight.

Personal life
Sheridan and his wife, actress Colette Kilroy, have three children. They live in Los Angeles.

Filmography

Film

Television

References

External links

1951 births
20th-century American male actors
21st-century American male actors
Living people
Male actors from Pasadena, California
American male television actors
American male film actors
American male stage actors
American male Shakespearean actors